The ochraceous pewee (Contopus ochraceus) is a species of bird in the family Tyrannidae. It is found in Costa Rica and western Panama. Its natural habitat is subtropical or tropical moist montane forests.

References

ochraceous pewee
Birds of the Talamancan montane forests
ochraceous pewee
ochraceous pewee
ochraceous pewee
Taxonomy articles created by Polbot